Fletcher Roberts (born 3 June 1993) is a former professional Australian rules footballer who played for the  in the Australian Football League (AFL).

Early life
Roberts was educated at De La Salle College, Malvern and Melbourne Grammar School and attracted attention after kicking four goals in the last quarter of the 2011 TAC Cup Grand Final to lead the Sandringham Dragons to victory. He was then recruited by the Bulldogs in the 2012 Pre-season Draft, with pick #11.

AFL career
Roberts made his AFL debut in round 20, 2012, against  at the Melbourne Cricket Ground.

Roberts struggled to hold down a spot in the senior side in 2014, playing only five games, but started to show signs of developing into a tall defender for the Bulldogs' VFL side Footscray. The highlight of the season was in the final round against Richmond's VFL side at Punt Road Oval. Trailing by 33 points in the final quarter, Footscray fought back to snatch the lead, only for the Tigers to steady with a goal and seemingly have the game won. With seconds remaining, Roberts took a pack mark and as the siren sounded, lined up from 60 metres. He kicked truly to give Footscray a memorable three-point victory and secure second place on the VFL ladder. Sadly, Roberts would miss Footscray's 2014 VFL premiership triumph through injury.

In 2016, Roberts was not selected until the Round 6 clash against  due to recovery from an injury interrupted pre-season, but would then play 15 of the remaining 16 games during the home-and-away season. He was one of the players dropped for the Elimination Final, but would be recalled for the Preliminary Final to replace the injured Matt Suckling. Despite suffering an early facial injury, Roberts returned to play arguably his best game for the club, holding the dangerous Jeremy Cameron goalless as the Bulldogs advanced to the Grand Final. After some uncertainty early in the week leading up to the Grand Final, it was announced that Roberts retained his place in the team ahead of Suckling, which meant that the Bulldogs would field a team that had no experience in an AFL Grand Final. In the match, Roberts combined with Joel Hamling to shut down 's twin threats of Lance Franklin and Kurt Tippett, limiting their output to just one goal to help the Bulldogs clinch an emotional 22-point win, ending their 62-year premiership drought.

Roberts is currently playing for the Port Melbourne Football Club in the Victorian Football League.

Personal life
Roberts studied a Bachelor of Psychology at Deakin University.

Statistics
 Statistics are correct to the end of the 2019 season

|- style="background:#eaeaea;"
! scope="row" style="text-align:center" | 2012
|style="text-align:center;"|
| 18 || 2 || 0 || 0 || 16 || 5 || 21 || 7 || 1 || 0.0 || 0.0 || 8.0 || 2.5 || 10.5 || 3.5 || 0.5
|-
! scope="row" style="text-align:center" | 2013
|style="text-align:center;"|
| 18 || 0 || — || — || — || — || — || — || — || — || — || — || — || — || — || —
|- style="background:#eaeaea;"
! scope="row" style="text-align:center" | 2014
|style="text-align:center;"|
| 18 || 5 || 0 || 1 || 19 || 16 || 35 || 10 || 10 || 0.0 || 0.2 || 3.8 || 3.2 || 7.0 || 2.0 || 2.0
|-
! scope="row" style="text-align:center" | 2015
|style="text-align:center;"|
| 18 || 12 || 0 || 1 || 55 || 61 || 116 || 41 || 19 || 0.0 || 0.1 || 4.6 || 5.1 || 9.7 || 3.4 || 1.6
|- style="background:#eaeaea;"
| scope=row bgcolor=F0E68C | 2016# 
|style="text-align:center;"|
| 18 || 18 || 0 || 0 || 72 || 92 || 164 || 47 || 25 || 0.0 || 0.0 || 4.0 || 5.1 || 9.1 || 2.6 || 1.4
|- class="sortbottom"
|-
! scope="row" style="text-align:center" | 2017
|style="text-align:center;"|
| 18 || 10 || 0 || 0 || 55 || 40 || 95 || 27 || 13 || 0.0 || 0.0 || 5.5 || 4.0 || 9.5 || 2.7 || 1.3
|- style="background:#eaeaea;"
|-
! scope="row" style="text-align:center" | 2018
|style="text-align:center;"|
| 18 || 2 || 0 || 0 || 18 || 4 || 22 || 7 || 1 || 0.0 || 0.0 || 9.0 || 2.0 || 11.0 || 3.5 || 0.5
|- style="background:#eaeaea;"
|-
! scope="row" style="text-align:center" | 2019
|style="text-align:center;"|
| 18 || 2 || 0 || 0 || 10 || 8 || 18 || 4 || 3 || 0.0 || 0.0 || 5.0 || 4.0 || 9.0 || 2.0 || 1.5
|- style="background:#eaeaea;"
! colspan=3| Career
! 51
! 0
! 2
! 245
! 226
! 471
! 143
! 72
! 0.0
! 0.0
! 4.8
! 4.4
! 9.2
! 2.8
! 1.4
|}

Honours and achievements
AFL
Team
AFL premiership: 2016
VFL
Team
VFL premiership: 2014

References

External links

 Match ratings from Inside Football

1993 births
Living people
Western Bulldogs players
Western Bulldogs Premiership players
Australian rules footballers from Victoria (Australia)
Sandringham Dragons players
Williamstown Football Club players
Port Melbourne Football Club players
One-time VFL/AFL Premiership players